The 2016–17 Slovak Cup (also known as the 2016–17 Slovnaft Cup for sponsorship reasons) is the 48th edition of the competition. The winners of the competition will qualify for the first qualifying round of the 2017–18 UEFA Europa League.

Participating teams

Fortuna Liga (12 Teams)

2. liga (18 Teams)

3. liga (43 Teams)

4. liga (60 Teams)

5. liga (69 Teams)

source: futbalnet.sk

First round
The matches were played from 23 July to 2 August 2016.

|-
!colspan="3" align="center"|23 July

|-
!colspan="3" align="center"|24 July

|-
!colspan="3" align="center"|27 July

|-
!colspan="3" align="center"|30 July

|-
!colspan="3" align="center"|31 July

|-
!colspan="3" align="center"|2 August

|}

Second round
The matches were played from 31 July to 23 August 2016.

|-
!colspan="3" align="center"|31 July

|-
!colspan="3" align="center"|9 August

|-
!colspan="3" align="center"|10 August

|-
!colspan="3" align="center"|16 August

|-
!colspan="3" align="center"|17 August

|-
!colspan="3" align="center"|23 August

|}

Third round
The matches were played from 24 August to 21 September 2016.

|-
!colspan="3" align="center"|24 August

|-
!colspan="3" align="center"|31 August

|-
!colspan="3" align="center"|7 September

|-
!colspan="3" align="center"|13 September

|-
!colspan="3" align="center"|14 September

|-
!colspan="3" align="center"|21 September

|}

Fourth round
The matches were played from 27 September to 5 October 2016.

|-
!colspan="3" align="center"|27 September

|-
!colspan="3" align="center"|28 September

|-
!colspan="3" align="center"|5 October

|}

Fifth round
The matches were played from 18 October to 30 November 2016.

|-
!colspan="3" align="center"|18 October

|-
!colspan="3" align="center"|19 October

|-
!colspan="3" align="center"|22 November

|-
!colspan="3" align="center"|30 November

|}

Quarter-finals
The matches were played on 7 and 8 March 2017.

Semi-finals
The matches were played from 4 to 12 April 2017.

First leg

Second leg

Final

References

External links 
 Slovak Cup at Futbalnet.sk
 Slovak Cup at Soccerway.com

Slovak Cup seasons
Cup
Slovak Cup